Cynithia "Janay" DeLoach (born October 12, 1985) is a United States track and field athlete who won the bronze medal in the women's long jump at the 2012 Summer Olympics. She was listed in The Coloradoan's #3 Top Sports Story of 2011 about her road to the 2012 Olympics. She is currently signed to Nike and trains in Colorado.

Early years

She graduated from Ben Eielson High School located in Eielson AFB, Alaska May 19, 2003. Janay Deloach grew up as a "military brat" living in many different places but Eielson AFB and the Ravens became her home. She played basketball and track for the Ravens throughout high school and was even on the cheerleading team in her freshman year. She was the leading scorer for the Lady Ravens basketball team with quite a few scholarship opportunities as well.

She was recruited for scholarships in track and field as well as basketball and academics. She went to college at Colorado State University for track and field in the fall of 2003.

Professional career

She was 21st in the long jump at the U.S. 2008 Summer Olympic Trials for the long jump She won the long jump at the Birmingham Grand Prix meeting and was sixth in the event at the 2011 World Championships in Athletics. She won her first major medal at the 2012 IAAF World Indoor Championships, coming second to Brittney Reese with a clearance of 6.98 m.

2012 U.S. Olympic Trials

Janay competed in the 2012 U.S. Olympic Trials in Eugene, Oregon from June 29-July 1, 2012. While there she managed to earn the number three spot in the U.S. long jump finals with a jump of 7.03m (her career-best). With a new career-best jump she made the 2012 U.S. Olympic team for long jump and qualified to compete in London in August 2012.

2012 Olympics 
At the 2012 Summer Olympics, Janay won the bronze medal with a jump of 6.89 m.

2014 US Indoor Track and Field Championships
Janay finished 2nd in New Mexico at the 2014 USA Indoor Track and Field Championships in the 60-meter hurdles with a time of 7.82 seconds.

2014 IAAF World Indoor Championships
At the 2014 World Indoor Athletics Championships, Janay competed in the women's 60 m hurdles.  She finished 2nd in her prelim (8.01 seconds), 2nd in her semifinal (7.93 seconds) and 5th in the World Final (7.90 seconds).

2015 IAAF World Outdoor Championships
Janay competed in the long jump after qualifying at the 2015 USA Outdoor Track and Field Championships with a jump of 6.95m off her opposite leg (right leg). She qualified for the final with a jump of 6.68 m.  In the World Championship final, she finished in 8th place with a jump of 6.67 m.

2016 U.S. Olympic Trials
Janay took third in the long jump at the trials in Eugene, Oregon.

2016 Summer Olympics
The final US representative for Women's,s Long Jump, she was the only one of the three (the other two being eventual gold and silver medalists Tianna Bartoletta and Brittney Reese) to miss the final, missing out by .03 metres.

Personal life

Janay Deloach was born to Dede and William Deloach on October 12, 1985. She graduated from Colorado State University with a bachelor's degree in psychology and human development and family studies and a master's degree in occupational therapy.  She formerly married fellow CSU athlete Patrick Soukup; the couple later divorced, but have since been remarried. They are expecting their first child together in 2018.

References

External links
 
 
 
 

1985 births
American female long jumpers
Colorado State Rams women's track and field athletes
Living people
People from Fairbanks North Star Borough, Alaska
Sportspeople from Fort Collins, Colorado
Sportspeople from Alaska
Athletes (track and field) at the 2012 Summer Olympics
Athletes (track and field) at the 2016 Summer Olympics
Olympic bronze medalists for the United States in track and field
Medalists at the 2012 Summer Olympics
World Athletics Championships athletes for the United States
USA Outdoor Track and Field Championships winners
USA Indoor Track and Field Championships winners